This list shows the richest Japanese citizens by net worth, based on the list published by Forbes annually.

2022 

Based on Forbes The World's Billionaires 2022

2015 

Based on Forbes Japan's Richest 2015

2013 
Based on Forbes Japan's Richest 2013

2012 
Based on Forbes Japan's Richest 2012

2010 
Based on Forbes Japan's Richest 2010

2007 
Based on Forbes Japan's Richest 2007

2006 
Based on Forbes Japan's Richest 2006

1996 
Based on Forbes World's Billionaires 1991

1991 
Based on Forbes World's Billionaires 1991

See also 
 The World's Billionaires
 List of countries by the number of US dollar billionaires
 Lists of people by nationality
 List of Japanese people

References 

Forbes.com: Japan's 50 Richest:
 2013
Forbes.com: Japan's 40 Richest:
 2012
 2010
 2007
 2006

Lists of people by wealth
Net worth
 
Economy of Japan-related lists